Ella Fitzgerald Sings the Rodgers and Hart Song Book is a 1956 studio album by the American jazz singer Ella Fitzgerald, with a studio orchestra conducted and arranged by Buddy Bregman, focusing on the songs written by Richard Rodgers and Lorenz Hart.

This album was inducted into the Grammy Hall of Fame in 1999, which is a special Grammy award established in 1973 to honor recordings that are at least twenty-five years old, and that have "qualitative or historical significance."

In 2000 it was voted number 642 in Colin Larkin's All Time Top 1000 Albums.

Track listing
For the 1956 Verve 2-LP album, Verve MG V-4002-2

In 2012, Verve also released an audiophile downloadable version of the LP in up to 192 kHz/24 bit lossless FLAC quality.

Personnel
 Ella Fitzgerald - Vocals
 Buddy Bregman - Arranger, Conductor.
Liner notes by Richard Rodgers, Oscar Hammerstein II, William Simon and Norman Granz.

References

1956 albums
Verve Records albums
Ella Fitzgerald albums
Albums arranged by Buddy Bregman
Albums produced by Norman Granz
Grammy Hall of Fame Award recipients
Albums conducted by Buddy Bregman